The 2022–23 South West Peninsula League season is the 16th in the history of the South West Peninsula League, a football competition in England, that feeds the Premier Division of the Western Football League. The league was formed in 2007 from the merger of the Devon County League and the South Western League, and, with the exception of Bridport in Dorset, features clubs based in Cornwall and Devon. The two divisions of the South West Peninsula League are on the same level of the National League System as the Western League Division One (Step 6).

The constitution was announced on 12 May 2022.

With a view to a merger between the South West Peninsula League and the Western League in 2023–24, four clubs were to be automatically promoted from each division to Step 5, depending on ground grading. The fifth-placed clubs may also have been promoted, on a PPG (points per game) basis. However, the FA scrapped the merger in February 2023 after a breakdown in negotiations, and promotion was reverted to one club per division.

Premier Division East

Premier Division East features 19 teams, reduced from 20 the previous season, after Torpoint Athletic were promoted to the Western League Premier Division; Stoke Gabriel & Torbay Police were relegated and Ottery St Mary resigned from the league. 

Holsworthy were initially transferred to Premier Division West, but were transferred back after the reprieve of St Dennis.

Two clubs joined the division:
Bridport, relegated from the Western League Premier Division.
Teignmouth, promoted from the Devon Football League South & West Division.

League table

Results table

Stadia and locations

Premier Division West

Premier Division West features 18 teams, the same as the previous season after Falmouth Town were promoted to the Western League Premier Division, and Porthleven resigned from the league.

St Dennis were initially relegated from the league, but were reprieved due to a resignation elsewhere in the pyramid.

Two clubs joined the division:
Bude Town, promoted from the St Piran Football League East Division.
Mullion, promoted from the St Piran Football League West Division.

League table

Results table

Stadia and locations

References

External links
 South West Peninsula League

South West Peninsula League
10